Hesperisternia multangulus, the ribbed cantharus, is a species of sea snail in the family Pisaniidae. The ribbed cantharus was first formally named by Rodolfo Amando Philippi in 1848 as Fusus multangulus. The type locality is from the Yucatán Peninsula.

Description
The length of the shell attains 24.1 mm.

Distribution
This species occurs off Yucatan, Mexico in the Caribbean Sea.

References

Further reading
 Rosenberg, G.; Moretzsohn, F.; García, E. F. (2009). Gastropoda (Mollusca) of the Gulf of Mexico, Pp. 579–699 in: Felder, D.L. and D.K. Camp (eds.), Gulf of Mexico–Origins, Waters, and Biota. Texas A&M Press, College Station, Texas

Pisaniidae
Gastropods described in 1848
Taxa named by Rodolfo Amando Philippi